"Mary Jane" is a song by American musician Rick James. It was released on September 9, 1978 as the second single from his debut album Come Get It!. The song peaked in the top five on the R&B charts in the United States in 1978, and crossed over to the US Hot 100.

Background
As one of his earliest hits as a solo artist, it is one of his most notable songs. It was composed by James, along with keyboardist Billy Nunn, who was credited for the keyboards, strings, background vocals, helping to compose the song, arranging flute parts, and other instrumentation work. The lyrics of the song are a thinly-veiled ode to James' love of marijuana aka "Mary Jane". During live performances of the song, James frequently had stage props that looked like giant joints and then would light up an actual joint.

Charts

References

1978 singles
Rick James songs
Songs about cannabis
Songs written by Rick James
1977 songs
Gordy Records singles
Song recordings produced by Art Stewart
Song recordings produced by Rick James